The 2019–20 season will be Újpest FC's 139th competitive season, 128nd consecutive season in the OTP Bank Liga and 127th year in existence as a football club.

Season events
On 25 February, Újpest announced that their home games against Puskás Akadémia and Paks would be played at the ZTE Arena in Zalaegerszeg instead of Újpest's regular Szusza Ferenc Stadion in Budapest.

On 11 March, the Hungarian Football Federation announced that all games would be played behind closed doors due to the COVID-19 pandemic, before announcing that all games had been postponed on 16 March.

Squad

Transfers

In

Loans out

Out

Loans out

Released

Competitions

Nemzeti Bajnokság I

League table

Results summary

Results by round

Results

Magyar Kupa

Squad Statistics

Appearances and goals

|-
|colspan="12"|Players away on loan :
|-
|colspan="12"|Players who left Újpest during the season:

|}

Goal scorers

Clean sheets

Disciplinary Record

References

External links
 Official Website
 UEFA
 Fixtures and results

Újpest FC seasons
Hungarian football clubs 2019–20 season